Thomas Gawthrop "Doggie" Trenchard (May 3, 1874 – October 16, 1943) was an All-American football player at Princeton University in 1893 and a college football head coach at the University of North Carolina at Chapel Hill, the University of Pittsburgh, and West Virginia University. Trenchard earned the nickname "Doggie" because of his shaggy haired appearance.

Early life and playing career
Trenchard was born in Queen Anne's County, Maryland. Prior to his coaching career, Trenchard was a professional football player from 1895 until 1898 for the Latrobe Athletic Association and the Allegheny Athletic Association. He also played for the 1898 Western Pennsylvania All-Star football team, formed by Latrobe manager Dave Berry.

Coaching career
In 1895, and from 1913 to 1915, he coached at North Carolina, where he compiled a 26–9–2 record. His best season there came in 1914, when North Carolina went 10–1. In 1896, he coached at West Virginia and compiled a 3–7–2 record. In 1897, he coached at Pittsburgh, and compiled a 1–3 record.

Head coaching record

References

Additional sources

External links
 

1874 births
1943 deaths
19th-century players of American football
American football ends
1898 Western Pennsylvania All-Star football players
Allegheny Athletic Association players
Latrobe Athletic Association players
North Carolina Tar Heels football coaches
North Carolina Tar Heels athletic directors
Pittsburgh Panthers football coaches
Princeton Tigers football players
West Virginia Mountaineers football coaches
Washington and Lee Generals football coaches
All-American college football players
People from Queen Anne's County, Maryland